Lesia Bilozub (born 1 September 1971) is a Ukrainian speed skater. She competed in two events at the 1998 Winter Olympics.

References

External links
 

1971 births
Living people
Ukrainian female speed skaters
Olympic speed skaters of Ukraine
Speed skaters at the 1998 Winter Olympics
Sportspeople from Kyiv